B120  may refer to:
 State route B120 or Hopkins Highway, a highway in south-western Victoria, Australia
 B120 series Sunny Truck, a truck by Nissan